The 1936–37 Idaho Vandals men's basketball team represented the University of Idaho during the 1936–37 NCAA college basketball season. Members of the Pacific Coast Conference, the Vandals were led by first-year head coach Forrest Twogood and played their home games on campus at Memorial Gymnasium in Moscow, Idaho.

Notable players were dual-sport stars Steve Belko and Lyle Smith, both future coaches and administrators.

References

External links
Sports Reference – Idaho Vandals: 1936–37 basketball season
Gem of the Mountains: 1937 University of Idaho yearbook – 1936–37 basketball season
Idaho Argonaut – student newspaper – 1937 editions

Idaho Vandals men's basketball seasons
Idaho
Idaho
Idaho